The CentreView newspaper is a local weekly newspaper for the serving the towns of Centreville, Chantilly and Clifton in Northern Virginia.

External links
 CentreView website. Retrieved on 2006-07-22.
 Centreville, Virginia community website

Newspapers published in Virginia